The 1942 Nevada gubernatorial election was held on November 3, 1942. Incumbent Democrat Edward P. Carville defeated Republican nominee Aaron V. Tallman with 60.26% of the vote.

Primary elections
Primary elections were held on September 1, 1942.

Democratic primary

Candidates
Edward P. Carville, incumbent Governor
Roland H. Wiley, attorney

Results

General election

Candidates
Edward P. Carville, Democratic
Aaron V. Tallman, Republican

Results

References

1942
Nevada
Gubernatorial
November 1942 events